Atacamita is a genus of beetles in the family Buprestidae, containing the following species:

 Atacamita arriagadai Moore, 2001
 Atacamita biimpressa (Philippi & Philippi, 1860)
 Atacamita chiliensis (Laporte & Gory, 1835)

References

Buprestidae genera